Lieutenant General Thomas Samuel Moorman (July 11, 1910 – December 23, 1997) was a senior officer in the United States Air Force who served as the fifth Superintendent of the United States Air Force Academy at Colorado Springs, Colorado.

Early life
Moorman was born at the Presidio of Monterey, California on July 11, 1910. He attended John J. Phillips High School in Birmingham, Alabama. In 1933 he graduated from the United States Military Academy at West Point, New York and entered the Air Corps flying training school at Randolph Field, Texas.

Military career
Moorman earned his pilot wings in October 1934 and was assigned to the 4th Observation Squadron, 5th Composite Group at Luke Field, Hawaii. In July 1936, Moorman was reassigned to the 97th Reconnaissance Squadron at Mitchel Field, New York for a 12-month tour.

In 1937 Moorman entered the field of meteorology, obtained a Master of Science degree from the California Institute of Technology and embarked on a sphere of activity which would dominate the next 20 years of his career. After a two-year assignment as Weather Officer at Randolph Field, Texas, he gained valuable information in meteorology through further study at the Massachusetts Institute of Technology.

In July 1941, Moorman was assigned to Air Corps Headquarters in Washington, D.C., where he served as chief climatologist and assistant director of the Air Corps Research Center and liaison officer to the United States Weather Bureau. From May 1943 until December 1943, Moorman was commanding officer of the 21st Weather Squadron, first at Bradley Field, Connecticut, and later in England.

Moorman became staff weather officer and later director of weather for Ninth Air Force in the European Theater of Operations, a position he held from January 1944 until December 1944. From January 1945 until June 1945, he served as commanding officer of the 21st Weather Squadron and Staff Weather Officer for Ninth Air Force. After V-J Day in 1945, Moorman returned to the United States as deputy chief of staff for Air Weather Service. One year later he became air weather officer at Headquarters Army Air Forces and remained in that position until he entered the Air War College at Maxwell Air Force Base, Alabama.

From July 1948 until June 1951, Moorman served with the United States Far East Air Force in Tokyo as commander of the 2143d Air Weather Wing (now the 1st Weather Wing), and upon his return to the United States he became deputy commander of the Air Weather Service at Andrews Air Force Base, Maryland.

On April 22, 1954, Moorman's 16 years of weather operations culminated in his appointment as Air Weather Service commander, responsible for providing environmental support to the Air Force and Army through weather central forecast centers, base weather stations, observation sites, worldwide weather reconnaissance and atmospheric sampling.

Returning to the Far East in 1958, Moorman assumed command of the Thirteenth Air Force at Clark Air Base, Philippines. He was responsible for air operations throughout Southeast Asia, as well as for the air defense of the Philippines in conjunction with the Philippine Air Force.

On July 28, 1961, Moorman became vice commander in chief, Headquarters Pacific Air Forces, Hickam Air Force Base, Hawaii, and on July 1, 1965, Moorman became Superintendent of the United States Air Force Academy at Colorado Springs, Colorado.

Among Moorman's awards and decorations are the Army Distinguished Service Medal, Air Force Distinguished Service Medal, Legion of Merit with two oak leaf clusters, Bronze Star Medal, the Air Medal, and the Army Commendation Medal. He retired August 1, 1970, and died December 23, 1997, at the Falcons Landing retirement community in Sterling, Virginia.

References

United States Air Force generals
Superintendents of the United States Air Force Academy
United States Military Academy alumni
Recipients of the Air Force Distinguished Service Medal
Recipients of the Legion of Merit
United States Army personnel of World War II
Military personnel from California
American people of Dutch descent
1910 births
1997 deaths
Recipients of the Air Medal
Recipients of the Order of the Sword (United States)
20th-century American academics